MTV2 Headbangers Ball Volume 2 is the second in a series of heavy metal compilation albums released in conjunction with the MTV2 program Headbangers Ball. The 2-disc album continues the theme of featuring mainstream acts on the first disc and brutal, underground styles on the second disc. It won Metal Edge magazine's 2004 Readers' Choice Award for "Compilation Album of the Year."

Track listing

Uncensored Version
The uncensored version of the album contained the original versions of the censored songs and also contained DevilDriver's "Nothing's Wrong?", instead of Damageplan's "Breathing New Life." It is now no longer in production.

References

2004 compilation albums